The 1975–76 Divizia B was the 36th season of the second tier of the Romanian football league system.

The format has been maintained to three series, each of them having 18 teams. At the end of the season the winners of the series promoted to Divizia A and the last four places from each series relegated to Divizia C.

Team changes

To Divizia B
Promoted from Divizia C
 CS Botoșani
 Viitorul Vaslui
 Prahova Ploiești
 Cimentul Medgidia
 Dunărea Giurgiu
 Chimia Turnu Măgurele
 Minerul Motru
 Unirea Tomnatic
 Dacia Orăștie
 CIL Sighetu Marmației
 Gloria Bistrița
 Nitramonia Făgăraș

Relegated from Divizia A
 Steagul Roșu Brașov
 Chimia Râmnicu Vâlcea
 FC Galați

From Divizia B
Relegated to Divizia C
 Foresta Fălticeni
 Flacăra Moreni
 Minerul Baia Sprie
 Chimia Brăila
 Metalul Turnu Severin
 Minerul Anina
 Oțelul Galați
 Oltul Sfântu Gheorghe
 Vulturii Textila Lugoj
 Relonul Săvinești
 CSU Brașov
 Metalul Aiud

Promoted to Divizia A
 SC Bacău
 Rapid București
 Bihor Oradea

Renamed teams 
Arieșul Turda was renamed as Sticla Arieșul Turda.

Automatica Alexandria was renamed as Unirea Alexandria.

Dunărea Giurgiu was renamed as FCM Giurgiu.

FC Galați was renamed as FCM Galați.

Minerul Baia Mare was renamed as FC Baia Mare.

Progresul Brăila was renamed as FC Brăila.

Other teams 
Știința Bacău and CAROM Onești merged, the first one being absorbed by the second one. After the merge, CAROM was moved to Borzești, a village (now part of Onești) and renamed as CSM Borzești.

Constructorul Galați and Victoria Tecuci merged, the first one being absorbed by the second one.

League tables

Serie I

Serie II

Serie III

See also 
 1975–76 Divizia A
 1975–76 Divizia C
 1975–76 County Championship

References

Liga II seasons
Romania
2